Sunset Beach is situated in the West End near the Burrard Street Bridge and Vancouver International Hostel. The Vancouver Aquatic Centre lies at the East end of Sunset beach right next to the North end of Burrard Street Bridge.  The beach has lifeguards on duty in the warm months. Public washrooms and concession stands are nearby. Biking, walking and inline skating paths wind above the beach area, leading to Stanley Park in one direction and Yaletown in the other. There is an off leash area to the south of the Vancouver Aquatic Centre, an Olympic size natatorium.
It is a popular location for watching Vancouver fireworks.

See also
 Engagement (sculpture)

References

Beaches of Vancouver
West End, Vancouver